Hypotia griveaudi is a species of snout moth in the genus Hypotia. It was described by Patrice J.A. Leraut in 2004 and is known from Madagascar.

References

Moths described in 2004
Hypotiini
Lepidoptera of Madagascar
Moths of Africa